Justice League Heroes is a 2006 console video game for the Xbox and PlayStation 2 platforms. It was developed by Snowblind Studios, published by Warner Bros. Interactive Entertainment in conjunction with DC Comics and was distributed in Europe by Eidos Interactive. Based on the long-running comic book series Justice League, it was written by comic book writer Dwayne McDuffie. It uses the Snowblind Studios game engine.

Three handheld Justice League Heroes games were released at the same time for the Game Boy Advance, Nintendo DS and PlayStation Portable. Planned GameCube, Wii, PlayStation 3 and Xbox 360 versions were cancelled. The Nintendo DS game shares a similar visual style and gameplay mechanics to the console game, but serves as a prequel to its story. This version was developed by Sensory Sweep Studios. The GBA version is titled Justice League Heroes: The Flash and focused primarily on The Flash. The game featured 2D sidescrolling action gameplay and a sidestory to the console game's plot. This version was developed by WayForward Technologies.

Gameplay

The game features most of the best known superheroes from the DC Universe, including Superman, Batman, and Wonder Woman among others. Each level consists of two members of the Justice League battling a variety of villains and their henchmen. When the game is being played by a single player, the player can freely switch between playing as either of the two Justice League members at any time. In a two player game, the players can only switch which characters they control by mutual consent. There was another Justice League game in development from Midway Games that was canceled in 2004 but, according to Warner Bros., this game is totally unrelated to the current project.

Upon starting a new game, the player has immediate access to Superman, Batman, Wonder Woman, The Flash, John Stewart, Martian Manhunter, and Zatanna, but more characters (as well as alternative costumes) can be unlocked as the game progresses. These unlockable characters can only be used on levels in which the player(s) can choose which characters to take whereas the costumes can be used at any time.

There are also initially three difficulties (Easy, Medium, Hard) and then upon completion of Hard, Elite is unlocked, and then upon completion of Elite, Superhero is unlocked. In each successive difficulty level, the opponents do more damage to the superheroes and also have more health/life, offsetting the gains in skills. On Superhero difficulty, many of the opponents will kill most superheroes in one hit, so the player must have mastered a number of skills and strategies to deal with them.

Plot
The story of the game begins with Superman (voiced by Crispin Freeman)  and Batman (voiced by Ron Perlman) foiling the S.T.A.R. Labs ambush by robots controlled by Brainiac (voiced by Peter Jessop). After Batman and Superman defeat what they think is Brainiac, they discover that they have merely been diverted by a duplicate while another has raided the vaults of the Lab, taking Kryptonian DNA sample and a chunk of meteorite. Meanwhile, Zatanna (voiced by Kari Wahlgren)  and J'onn Jonzz the Martian Manhunter (voiced by Daniel Riordan) face off against Queen Bee (voiced by Abby Craden)  and her drones, who are being assisted in their gradual conversion of Metropolis by some of Brainiac's robots. After Metropolis has been saved, the League responds to a series of attempted nuclear missile hijackings; firstly, The Key (voiced by Carlos Alazraqui) attempts to hijack a missile before he is subdued by the Flash (voiced by Chris Edgerly) and Green Lantern John Stewart (voiced by Michael Jai White), followed by an attempt by Killer Frost (voiced by Nika Futterman)  which is foiled by Zatanna and Wonder Woman (voiced by Courtenay Taylor). Despite the League's efforts, one missile is launched undetected during a worldwide communications blackout caused by Brainiac.

However, the League realize it has been upgraded; capable of breaking Earth's orbit, the missile has actually been fired at Mars in an effort to free the White Martians, who will invade Earth upon being reawakened. Superman and J'onn J'onnz travel to Mars to stop them from escaping but this has been yet another diversion from Brainiac who, anticipating their success, took the opportunity to steal vital equipment from the White Martians. Brainiac has also freed Gorilla Grodd (voiced by Neil Kaplan) from imprisonment, who intends to take revenge on his jailors and humanity with use of his Earthquake Machine. While Wonder Woman assists Superman in stopping the few White Martian vessels that managed to escape Mars and J'onn Jonnz returns to the Watchtower, the rest of the League (including any unlocked characters the player may have accessed by this point) work together with Solovar (voiced by Nick Jameson)  to stop Grodd. Alone on the Watchtower, J'onn is ambushed by Doomsday (voiced by Charlie Davis) who takes him prisoner and takes over control of the Watchtower while Brainiac steals a Mother Box from the League's vaults. Regrouping in an emergency bunker, the League manage to retake the Watchtower, free J'onn and defeat Doomsday, before confronting the real Brainiac in his lair in Siberia.

Seemingly defeated, Brainiac suddenly returns to life as the Mother Box he has stolen activates - and screaming, he is disintegrated and replaced by Darkseid (voiced by David Sobolov), released from an interdimensional prison created by a Sensory Matrix Field Generator to which he called it "The Apokolips Hypercube", who has been manipulating Brainiac the entire time. Confronting the League, Darkseid - his powers augmented by the Mother Boxes - sentences the League to his fate by banishing them to another dimension with his Omega Beams, all except Superman. He then proceeds to transform Earth into a new Apokolips and holds Superman prisoner in a Kryptonite prison. The rest of the League land in an alternate dimension, and are separated upon entry. Batman and Zatanna, Wonder Woman, the Flash, J'onn J'onnzz, and Green Lantern all must fight separate groups of alien entities to survive and escape. Along the way, Green Lantern picks up a strange radiation that will allow them to survive Darkseid's Omega Beams. It turned out according to Batman, that Darkseid may have banished the League, but the Mother Box tricked him and sent them to that dimension. Regrouping, the League returns to the Apokoliptian Earth, where they rescue Superman, and defeat Darkseid by knocking him into the Sensory Matrix Field Generator, imprisoning him once again in his interdimensional prison and restoring Earth back to normal. Back at the Watchtower, with the Sensory Matrix Field Generator locked away in the League's vaults, Batman informs the others that if a danger like this should happen again, they would be there.

There are an additional four supervillains unique to the Nintendo versions of the game: both the GBA and DS versions feature Circe and Zoom, while the DS also includes The General and Prometheus.

Characters

Playable characters

 Arthur Curry / Aquaman
 Bruce Wayne / Batman
 Dinah Lance / Black Canary
 Wally West / The Flash
 Oliver Queen / Green Arrow
 Hal Jordan / Green Lantern
 John Stewart / Green Lantern
 Kyle Rayner / Green Lantern
 Kendra Saunders / Hawkgirl
 Helena Bertinelli / Huntress
 J'onn J'onzz / Martian Manhunter
 Kara Zor-El / Supergirl
 Kal-El / Clark Kent / Superman
 Diana Prince / Wonder Woman
 Zatanna Zatara

Villains

 Brainiac
 Circe
 Darkseid
 Doomsday
 General
 Gorilla Grodd
 Killer Frost
 The Key
 Prometheus
 Queen Bee
 White Martians
 Zoom

 "Striker" in the Game Boy Advance version
 "Striker" in the Nintendo DS version
 Appears as a non-player character in the Game Boy Advance version
 Appears as a non-player character in the Nintendo DS version
 Exclusive to the PSP version
 Does not appear in the Nintendo DS version
 Exclusive to the Game Boy Advance and Nintendo DS versions
 Exclusive to the PSP, PS2 and Xbox versions
 Does not appear in the Game Boy Advance version

Each of the seven main characters has at least two alternate skins (only Superman and Wonder Woman have three) that can be purchased in the same manner as the unlockable characters. These alternative costumes vary the characters game stats by small amounts and recreate classic or alternative costumes from the character's history. For example, Superman and the Flash can be made to look like their older counterparts from the Earth-Two universe (Jay Garrick included), while one of the alternative costumes for Batman is the famous blue and grey costume with the yellow elliptic bat emblem on his chest, as well as the Batman Beyond suit. The unlockable Green Lanterns have exactly the same powers as John Stewart and are effectively just changes to the costume, voice, and minor visual differences in their powers and combat animations and fight idles: John Stewart has a rectangular shield, Rayner a triangular one.

Reception

The PS2, Xbox and PSP versions received "mixed or average" reviews according to the review aggregation website Metacritic.

The PlayStation Portable version was praised for customization and co-op game play. It also received better reviews by both fans and critics than the console versions.
The game was unfavorably compared to the similar multiplayer Marvel games X-Men Legends and Marvel: Ultimate Alliance, which allow the player to choose any character on any level, while Justice League Heroes contains several levels where the choice was taken away.

The DS version was not well received as well, with Nintendo Power giving it a 3.5, GameSpot a 5/10 and IGN a 4.4. The GBA version received generally positive critical response.

References

External links
 

2006 video games
Batman video games
Cooperative video games
Action role-playing video games
Heroes
Nintendo DS games
PlayStation 2 games
PlayStation Portable games
Snowblind Studios games
Superhero crossover video games
Superman video games
Video games developed in the United States
Xbox games
Alien invasions in video games
Warner Bros. video games
Video games set in Africa
Video games set in the United States
Video games set in Russia
Video games set on Mars
Sensory Sweep Studios games
Multiplayer and single-player video games